ThisIsRealMusic.com is an online hip-hop, soul and urban alternative music discovery tool.  The site hosts a collective of indie, midstream and mainstream artists from across the globe and serves as a source to learn about and listen to new and established musicians. The site was originally created and programmed by its current Editor in Chief, Talib Nelson in 2006 as a music blog. But after a new partnership with indie film producer Terrance Wilmore and a massive overhaul, it turned into a fully functioning music website with articles, music videos, blogs, a music sampler, video interviews, free downloads (legal) and video blogs created by some of the artists themselves.  The website relaunched in February 2009 and has since been able to align itself among bigger more established music sites.

Featured Artists
Eric Roberson
Lenny Kravitz
Amel Larrieux
J*Davey
The Foreign Exchange
Jay-Z
Jimi Hendrix
Kanye West
The Roots
Little Dragon
Musiq Soulchild
Talib Kweli
YahZarah
Citizen Cope
Jill Scott
SaRa
Erykah Badu
Outkast
Lupe Fiasco
TV On The Radio
The Gorillaz
N.E.R.D.
Raheem Devaughn
And more...

References

External links
 ThisisRealMusic.com
 Webby Discovery: ThisisRealMusic.com
 Review of ThisisRealMusic.com

American music websites